Wonder Woman Flight of Courage is a Rocky Mountain Construction roller coaster at Six Flags Magic Mountain in Valencia, California. The roller coaster opened on July 16, 2022, as the world's longest and tallest single-rail roller coaster. It features an 87-degree first drop and  three inversions and is located in the DC Universe area of the park, which was expanded and remodeled to include a new restaurant and bar, as well as retail locations featuring exclusive DC Comics merchandise.

History
On October 21, 2021, Wonder Woman Flight of Courage was announced by Six Flags Magic Mountain, along with the opening year of 2022. The roller coaster is located at the former site of two attractions; Green Lantern: First Flight and Tidal Wave. The new ride also reuses the former Green Lantern: First Flight station.

Construction of the attraction had begun two months before the announcement in August 2021 with land clearing. Track pieces had already arrived around the same time.

Wonder Woman Flight of Courage opened on July 16, 2022.

References

External links
Wonder Woman Flight of Courage on Six Flags Magic Mountain's website

Six Flags Magic Mountain
Roller coasters in California
Roller coasters operated by Six Flags